Kruševac is a city and the administrative center of the Rasina District in central Serbia. It is located in the valley of West Morava, on Rasina river. According to the 2011 census, the city administrative area has a population of 136,752 while the urban area has 81,316 inhabitants.

The city was founded in 1371, by Prince Lazar of Serbia (1371–1389), who used it as his seat.

Etymology
The etymology is derived from the Serbian word for "river stone", krušac which was largely used for a building at that time.

History
Kruševac was founded in 1371, as a fortified town in the possession of Lord Lazar Hrebeljanović. The Lazarica Church (or Church of St, Stephen) was built by Lazar between 1375–78, in the Morava architectural style. It is mentioned in one of Lazar's edicts in 1387, as his seat, when he affirmed the rights of Venetian merchants on Serbian territory. In preparation for the Battle of Kosovo (1389) against the Ottoman Empire, the Serbian army assembled in the city. The site of Lazar's palace is marked by a ruined enclosure containing a fragment of the tower of his spouse Princess Milica, and, according to legend, tidings of the defeat were brought to her by crows from the battlefield. After the battle, the city was held by Princess Milica as her seat. The little that remains of Lazar's city is the Kruševac Fortress, which was declared a Cultural Monument of Exceptional Importance in 1979. Several old Ottoman houses were left at the beginning of the 20th century, besides an old Turkish fountain and bath, which was known as Alacahisar (Aladža Hisar) during Ottoman rule between 1427–1833 (nominally to 1867) when Kruševac was the seat of the Sanjak of Kruševac. The Ottoman rule was interrupted during Austrian occupations between 1688–1690 and 1717–1739.

A large monument dedicated to Serbs fallen at the Battle of Kosovo was sculpted by Đorđe Jovanović and unveiled by King Petar I Karađorđević of Serbia in 1904. A detail on the monument, among others, is a statue of the famous blind Serbian poet Filip Višnjić.

At the beginning of the German occupation of Yugoslavia the units of Yugoslav Army in the Fatherland commanded by Dragutin Keserović and supported by one detachment of communists attacked the German garrison in September 1941 but failed to liberate the town after four days battle. During World War II mass executions of patriots and antifascists occurred on hill Bagdala. Largest execution was in summer of 1943. At place of executions now is a monument named Slobodište (from the Serbian word "sloboda", which means 'freedom'). Kruševac was liberated on 14 October when chetnik collaborators and Germans left the city together. After the regime of communists in Serbia ended the Government of Serbia  and its Ministry of Justice established the commission to research atrocities that were committed by members of the Yugoslav Partisan Movement after they gained control over Serbia in Autumn 1944. According to the report of this commission, out of 55,554 registered victims of communist purges in Serbia the new communist regime in Kruševac killed 493 people while 11 people are missing.

Kruševac progressed profusely during the SFRY. A large number of factories were built in that era, while Kruševac became one of the strongest industrial centres in both Serbia and Yugoslavia. The machine factory IMK 14. oktobar Kruševac employed around 7,000 workers.

However, the large Kruševac industry hasn't survived the post-Milošević transition. In 2002 alone 5 factories went bankrupt. From 2002 to 2014 27 factories closed and around 11,000 workers lost their jobs. The unemployment rate in Kruševac was almost 39% in 2015.

Settlements
Aside from the urban area of Kruševac, the city administrative area includes the following 100 settlements:

 Bošnjanе
 Begovo Brdo
 Bela Voda
 Belasica
 Bivolje
 Bovan
 Bojince
 Boljevac
 Brajkovac
 Bukovica
 Buci
 Velika Kruševica
 Velika Lomnica
 Veliki Kupci
 Veliki Šiljegovac
 Veliko Golovode
 Veliko Krušince
 Vitanovac
 Vratare
 Vučak
 Gavez
 Gaglovo
 Gari
 Globare
 Globoder
 Gornji Stepoš
 Grevci
 Grkljane
 Dvorane
 Dedina
 Dobromir
 Doljane
 Donji Stepoš
 Đunis
 Žabare
 Zdravinje
 Zebica
 Zubovac
 Jablanica
 Jasika
 Jošje
 Kamenare
 Kaonik
 Kapidžija
 Kobilje
 Komorane
 Konjuh
 Koševi
 Krvavica
 Kukljin
 Lazarevac
 Lazarica
 Lipovac
 Lovci
 Lukavac
 Ljubava
 Majdevo
 Makrešane
 Mala Vrbnica
 Mala Reka
 Mali Kupci
 Mali Šiljegovac
 Malo Golovode
 Malo Krušince
 Mačkovac
 Meševo
 Modrica
 Mudrakovac
 Naupare
 Padež
 Pakašnica
 Parunovac
 Pasjak
 Pepeljevac
 Petina
 Pozlata
 Poljaci
 Ribare
 Ribarska Banja
 Rlica
 Rosica
 Sebečevac
 Sezemče
 Slatina
 Srndalje
 Srnje
 Stanci
 Suvaja
 Sušica
 Tekija
 Trebotin
 Trmčare
 Ćelije
 Cerova
 Crkvina
 Čitluk
 Šavrane
 Šanac
 Šašilovac
 Šogolj
 Štitare

Demographics

According to the 2011 census results, the city of Kruševac has a total population of 128,752 inhabitants.

Ethnic groups
The ethnic composition of the city administrative area:

Economy
The most notable large companies based in the city of Kruševac are: Trayal Corporation, 14. oktobar, Rubin and Cooper Tire & Rubber Company Serbia. As of September 2017, Kruševac has one of 14 free economic zones established in Serbia.

The following table gives a preview of total number of registered people employed in legal entities per their core activity (as of 2019):

Politics
Seats in the city parliament won in the 2016 local elections:

Sports
The city's main football club is FK Napredak Kruševac, who regularly play in the Serbian SuperLiga.

Climate

Famous residents
 Stefan Lazarević (1377–1427), medieval ruler of Serbia
 Stojan Protić (1857–1923), Prime Minister of the Kingdom of Serbs, Croats and Slovenes 1918–1919, 1920
Ljubinka Bobić (1897–1978), Serbian actress
 Stanislav Binički (1872–1942), Serbian composer (Marš na Drinu)
 Dobrica Ćosić (1921–2014), Serbian writer, first President of FR Yugoslavia
 Taško Načić (1934–1993), Serbian actor
 Miodrag Petrović Čkalja (1924–2003), One of the most popular Serbian comedians
 Bata Paskaljević (1923–2004), Serbian actor
 Radmila Savićević (1926–2001), Serbian actress
 Ljiljana Jovanović (1930–2012), Serbian actress
 America Alonso (1936–2022) Venezuelan actress
 Miroslav Mišković (b. 1945), Serbian businessman
 Dragiša Binić (b. 1961), Serbian footballer, 1990–91 European Cup winner
 Milić Jovanović (b. 1966), Serbian footballer, 1990–91 European Cup winner
 Ognjen Petrović (1948–2000), Serbian footballer
 Nebojša Bradić (b. 1956), Serbian theatre director, and former Minister of Culture
 Goran Grbović (b. 1961), Serbian basketball player, bronze medalist at the EuroBasket 1987
 Vojin Ćetković (b. 1971), Serbian actor
 Marko Živić (1972–2021), Serbian actor
 Bojan Lazić (b. 1974), professional Serbian football player
 Nataša Tapušković (b. 1975), Serbian actress
 Branislav Trifunović (b. 1978), Serbian actor
 Bojan Zajić (b. 1980), Serbian footballer
 Aleksandar Mitrović (b. 1982), Serbian volleyball player
 Predrag Pavlović (b. 1986), Serbian footballer
 Milan Gajić (b. 1986), Serbian footballer
 Nikola Milošević (b. 1993), Serbian footballer
 Predrag Jovanović (b. 1950), Serbian musician
 Dragan Milosavljević (b. 1989), Serbian basketball player, silver medalist at the EuroBasket 2017
 Milica Todorović (born 1990), Serbian singer
 Sanja Vučić (born 1993), Serbian singer who represented Serbia in the Eurovision Song Contest 2016 and the Eurovision Song Contest 2021
 Ognjen Jaramaz (b. 1995), Serbian basketball player
 Tijana Bogdanović (b. 1998), Serbian taekwondo practitioner, European champion and silver medalist at the 2016 Summer Olympics
 Mimica Pavlović (b. 1984) Serbian footballer

International relations

Twin towns – Sister cities
Kruševac is twinned with:

Other forms of co-operation and city friendship similar to the twin/sister city programmes:

Gallery

See also
 List of cities in Serbia
 Rubin (company)

References

External links 

 
 krusevac.link portal
 037info Kruševac portal
 KruševacPRESS portal
 Kruševac Parliament portal
 Kruševac Info portal

 
Populated places in Rasina District
Municipalities and cities of Šumadija and Western Serbia
Former capitals of Serbia